General Sir Baker Creed Russell  (11 January 1837 – 25 November 1911) was an Australian-born British Army officer who served with distinction in the Indian Mutiny, Anglo-Ashanti War, Anglo-Zulu War, Sekhukhune Wars, and Egyptian War

Early life

Baker Creed Russell was born in 1837 at Ravensworth, Maitland, New South Wales, Australia, the son of the Hon. William Russell, of the New South Wales Legislative Council, formerly a captain in the 73rd Regiment.

Military career

Russell entered the British Army in 1855 as a cornet of the Carabiniers. Promoted to lieutenant on 1 August 1856, he was present at Meerut during the Indian Mutiny and took part in the pursuit of the Tantya Tope. He was promoted to captain on 18 February 1859. He was transferred to the 13th Hussars in 1862 and subsequently commanded that regiment. Promoted to brevet major on 24 January 1865, he accompanied Sir Garnet Wolseley to the Gold Coast during the first Ashanti Expedition in 1873.

Promoted to the substantive rank of major on 15 July 1878, he again served under Wolseley, this time in the Zulu campaign in 1879. For his successful leadership of the operations against Sekukuni, he was appointed a KCMG and aide-de-camp to Queen Victoria. He was a member of the Wolseley ring and was promoted to lieutenant colonel on 29 September 1880.

He commanded the 1st Cavalry Brigade during the Egyptian War in 1882. He led the midnight charge at Kassassin, was present at the battle of Tel el-Kebir and took part in the march to and occupation of Cairo.

He was, for a short time, Inspecting Officer of Auxiliary Cavalry in 1886. Promoted to major-general on 1 April 1889, he became General Officer Commanding the Aldershot Cavalry Brigade in 1890, General Officer Commanding the North Western District, which had its headquarters in Chester, in 1895 and Commander-in-Chief Bengal Command in 1896. Promoted to lieutenant general on 20 January 1897, he went on to be General Officer Commanding Southern District, based in Portsmouth, in 1898. In this capacity he was very conspicuous at Southampton Docks whenever troops were embarking for South Africa in the early stages of the Anglo-Boer War.

He died on 25 November 1911 in Folkestone, Kent.

References

Further reading
 Hew Strachan, The Politics of the British Army (1997)
Byron Farwell, Queen Victoria's Little Wars (1973)
Leigh Maxwell, The Ashanti Ring: Sir Garnet Wolseley's Campaigns 1870–1882 (London 1985)
Thomas Pakenham, The Boer War (1979) (indexed under Roberts and Wolseley Rings).
CRB Barrett, History of The XIII Hussars, William Blackwood and Sons, Edinburgh and London, 1911
Ian Castle & Raffaele Ruggeri,Zulu Wars – Volunteers, Irregulars and Auxiliaries, Osprey Publishing
Ian Knight, The Zulu War 1879, Osprey Publishing

Additional information
Oxford Dictionary of National Biography
Journals of Brigadier General Clarke's column and Colonel Baker-Russell's column, 26 July-17 Aug

External links
Baden Powell's First Commanding Officer
Woodcut engraving entitled With Russell's Column: Wounded Soldiers of the Native Contingent

|-
 

|-

1837 births
1911 deaths
British Army generals
Knights Commander of the Order of St Michael and St George
Knights Grand Cross of the Order of the Bath
British military personnel of the Third Anglo-Ashanti War
British Army personnel of the Anglo-Egyptian War
British Army personnel of the Anglo-Zulu War
People from Maitland, New South Wales
Carabiniers (6th Dragoon Guards) officers
Royal Fusiliers officers
British Army personnel of the Second Boer War
13th Hussars officers
People of the Sekukuni Campaign
Bengal Presidency